Calathus is a genus of ground beetle native to the Palearctic (including Europe), the Near East and North Africa. There are at least 190 described species in Calathus.

See also
 List of Calathus species

References

Further reading

External links

 Calathus at Fauna Europaea
 
 

Platyninae
 
Palearctic insects
Taxa named by Franco Andrea Bonelli